Trifolium medium, the zigzag clover, is a flowering plant species in the bean family Fabaceae. It is similar in appearance to red clover, Trifolium pratense, but the leaflets are narrower and have no white markings and the narrow stipules are not bristle-pointed. The species is native to Europe from Britain to the Caucasus.

References

medium
Flora of Europe
Flora of Norway
Taxa named by Carl Linnaeus